The 1955 Wimbledon Championships took place on the outdoor grass courts at the All England Lawn Tennis and Croquet Club in Wimbledon, London, United Kingdom. The tournament was held from Monday 20 June until Saturday 2 July 1955. It was the 69th staging of the Wimbledon Championships, and the third Grand Slam tennis event of 1955. Tony Trabert and Louise Brough won the singles titles.

Champions

Seniors

Men's singles

 Tony Trabert defeated  Kurt Nielsen, 6–3, 7–5, 6–1

Women's singles

 Louise Brough defeated  Beverly Fleitz, 7–5, 8–6

Men's doubles

 Rex Hartwig /  Lew Hoad defeated  Neale Fraser /  Ken Rosewall, 7–5, 6–4, 6–3

Women's doubles

 Angela Mortimer /  Anne Shilcock defeated  Shirley Bloomer /  Patricia Ward, 7–5, 6–1

Mixed doubles

 Vic Seixas /  Doris Hart defeated  Enrique Morea /  Louise Brough, 8–6, 2–6, 6–3

Juniors

Boys' singles

 Michael Hann defeated  Jan-Erik Lundqvist, 6–0, 11–9

Girls' singles

 Sheila Armstrong defeated  Béatrice de Chambure, 6–2, 6–4

References

External links
 Official Wimbledon Championships website

 
Wimbledon Championships
Wimbledon Championships
Wimbledon Championships
Wimbledon Championships